(Jesus, my joy), 227, is a motet by Johann Sebastian Bach. The longest and most musically complex of Bach's motets, it is set in eleven movements for up to five voices. It is named after the Lutheran hymn "" with words by Johann Franck, first published in 1653. The motet contains the six stanzas of the hymn in its odd-numbered movements. The hymn tune by Johann Crüger appears in all of these movements in different styles of chorale settings. The text of the motet's even-numbered movements is taken from the eighth chapter of the Epistle to the Romans, a passage that influenced key Lutheran teachings. The hymn, written in the first person with a focus on an emotional bond with Jesus, forms a contrasting expansion of the doctrinal biblical text. Bach set both texts alternating with and complementing each other, in a structure of symmetries on different layers.

Bach's treatment of Crüger's melody ranges from four-part chorale harmonisations that begin and end the work, to a chorale fantasia and a free setting that quotes only motifs of the hymn tune. Four biblical verses are set in the style of a motet, two for five voices and two for three voices. The central movement is a five-part fugue. Bach used word painting to intensify the theological meaning of both hymn and Epistle texts.

 is one of few works by Bach for five vocal parts. The dating of the work is uncertain. It was supposed to have been written for a specific funeral in Leipzig in July 1723, a few months after Bach had moved there, as a scholar proposed in 1912. Since the 1990s, musicologists have come to doubt this, because the order of that funeral was found and shows no reference to music by Bach. At least one of the eleven movements seems to have been composed before Bach's tenure in Leipzig. The Bach scholar Christoph Wolff suggested that Bach may have composed and compiled the motet for the education of his choir in both composition techniques and theology. Chorale settings from the motet are included in the Dietel manuscript from around 1735, providing a latest dating of the work.

Unique in its complex symmetrical structure juxtaposing hymn and biblical texts, and with movements featuring a variety of styles and vocal textures, the motet has been regarded as one of Bach's greatest achievements in the genre. In 1927, it became the first of his motets to be recorded. The work has often been performed and recorded with a range of approaches, from unaccompanied singing to historically informed performances taking into account that in Bach's time it was customary to support the voices by basso continuo and instruments doubling the vocal lines (colla parte).

History

Background 
In this context, motets are choral compositions, mostly with a number of independent voices exceeding that of a standard SATB choir, and with German text from the Luther Bible and Lutheran hymns, sometimes in combination. When a hymn was used, usually its chorale tune was integrated into the composition. Instrumental accompaniment was often limited to basso continuo and/or instruments playing . By the time Bach started to compose his motets in the 1710s or 1720s along the principles of these older compositions, the genre was already regarded as antiquated. According to Philipp Spitta, Bach's 19th-century biographer, Johann Michael Bach's motet , ABA I, 10, which contains a setting of the "" chorale, may have been on Johann Sebastian's mind when he composed his motet named after the chorale, in E minor like his relative's.

In Bach's time, the Lutheran liturgical calendar of the place where he lived indicated the occasions for which music was required in church services. The bulk of the composer's sacred music, including most of his church cantatas, was written for such occasions. His other church music, such as sacred cantatas for weddings and funerals, and most of his motets, was not tied to the liturgical calendar. Around 15 extant compositions came to be recognised as Bach motets by musicologists at some time. Jesu, meine Freude is one of only five core works (BWV 225–229) which have always been considered to be Bach motets.

In eleven movements,  is the longest and most musically complex of Bach's motets. It is scored for up to five vocal parts, which is rare among his works. Most of his vocal church music is to be performed with a four-part SATB choir, while most of his other motets are for double SATB choir. Exceptional compositions with five-part movements can be found in the Magnificat, written in 1723 at the beginning of Bach's tenure in Leipzig, and the Mass in B minor, compiled towards the end of his life. Like for most of his other motets, no continuo or other instrumental accompaniment has survived for BWV 227, but it is surmised there was one in Bach's time.

Epistle text and chorale 

In the motet, the six hymn stanzas form the odd movement numbers, while the even numbers each take one verse from the Epistle as their text. The hymn is written in the first person and deals with a believer's bond to Jesus who is addressed as a helper in physical and spiritual distress, and therefore a reason for joy. The singer realizes the world as vanity, and prefers to leave it. Franck used stark images such as "old dragon" and "death's jaw" to express the believer's enemies. The hymn adds a layer of individuality and emotions to Biblical teaching. When Catherine Winkworth translated the hymn into English in 1869, she rendered it as "Jesu, priceless treasure".

As a key teaching of the Lutheran faith, the Biblical text reflects on the contrast of living "in the flesh" or "according to the Spirit". The hymn's first line is also the last line of its final stanza, framing the poetry of the whole work.

Johann Crüger's chorale melody for the hymn, Zahn 8032, was first published in his hymnal Praxis pietatis melica of 1653; several variants of the hymn tune were published in other hymnals over the ensuing decades. The tune is in bar form (AAB). While the first version had dance elements of an Allemande, the version of the 1682 Neu Leipziger Gesangbuch, the hymnal used in Leipzig then, it is in common time. the melody is built from one motif, the beginning descent of a fifth (catabasis), with the word "Jesu" as the high note, which is immediately inverted. In the Leipzig version, the melody of the first line is identical to that of the last line. The hymn tune appears in the odd-numbered movements of the motet, completely in the Leipzig version for most stanzas, but paraphrased for the third stanza, and in a slightly different older version in the fifth stanza.

Time of origin
Spitta assigned the motets that he knew, including , to Bach's Leipzig years, 1723 to 1750. In 1912, Bernhard Friedrich Richter, a church musician in Leipzig, wrote that  was likely written in Bach's first year as Thomaskantor in Leipzig; he concluded that it was written for the funeral of Johanna Maria Kees, the wife of the Leipzig postmaster, on 18 July 1723, because a scripture reading of verse 11 from the Epistle passage set in the motet's tenth movement was documented for the funeral. Daniel R. Melamed, a musicologist from Cambridge University, wrote in his 1995 book that this was no conclusive evidence for a motet performance on the occasion, but the date has still been "nearly universally accepted". The order of that particular service was found in 1982, mentioning neither a motet nor even the chorale. Possibly the idea of combining hymn and epistle text dates back to the funeral.

Friedrich Smend was the first musicologist to analyse the motet's symmetrical structure, a feature which can also be found in Bach's St John Passion of 1724 and St Matthew Passion of 1727, which led Smend to suggest that the work was composed in the 1720s. Melamed thought that the motet was likely in part compiled from music Bach had composed before his Leipzig period. He based that view on the four-part settings of the chorale movements 1, 7 and 11 (unusual for a five-part work), and on the older version of the chorale melody used as the cantus firmus in the ninth movement. The latter suggests an origin of this movement in Bach's Weimar period (1708 to 1717), or even earlier. John Eliot Gardiner, who conducted the Bach Cantata Pilgrimage, noted that the motet, compiled partly from earlier compositions, is comparable in that respect to the Credo from Bach's Mass in B minor, and both are coherent in performance.

Christoph Wolff, a Bach scholar, suggested in 2002 that the motet may have been intended for the education of the Thomanerchor rather than for a funeral. He assumed the same intended use for the motet Singet dem Herrn ein neues Lied, BWV 225. According to Bach scholar Richard D. P. Jones, several movements of  show a style too advanced to have been written in 1723. He assumed in his 2013 book that the final arrangement of the work likely happened in the late 1720s, when two motets which can be dated with greater certainty were also written:  and the funeral motet Der Geist hilft unser Schwachheit auf, BWV 226. The Dietel manuscript, written around 1735, contains three chorales extracted from the motet; the composition of the motet is supposed to have been completed before that time.

Structure and scoring 
 is structured in eleven movements, with text alternating between a chorale stanza and a passage from the Epistle. Bach scored it for a choir of up to five voices (SSATB: one or two soprano parts (S or SS), alto (A), tenor (T) and B for bass). The number of voices in the movements varies from three to five. Only the alto sings in all movements. The motet was possibly meant to be accompanied by instruments playing , with instruments doubling the vocal lines in the practice of Bach's time, but no parts for them survived.

Table of the structure 
The music is arranged in different layers of symmetry around the sixth movement. The first and last movements have the same four-part setting of two different hymn stanzas. The second and penultimate movements use the same themes in fugal writing. The third and fifth movements, both five-part chorale settings, mirror the seventh and ninth movements, both four-part chorale settings. In great variety of chorale settings, the fifth movement is a free setting of the chorale stanza which quotes only motifs from the tune, and the ninth movement is a chorale fantasia, with the cantus firmus in the alto. The fourth and eighth movements are both trios, the fourth for the three highest voices, the other for the three lowest voices. The central movement (Romans 8:9) is a five-part fugue.

In the following table, each movement number is followed by the beginning of the text (incipit) and its translation into English, its text source naming the stanza in Franck's hymn or the verse(s) in Paul's Epistle, its voices, its key, its time signature, and its form. For the form, corresponding movements within the symmetry are shown at the same level of indentation.

Movements

1 
The motet begins with a four-part setting of the first stanza of the hymn "" ("Jesus, my joy" or "Jesus, Source of gladness"). The first movement is in E minor, like most other movements related to the hymn. The text, in the first person, speaks of longing for Jesus. Jones noted that the tenor part is particularly expressive. The last movement, the chorale's sixth stanza, has the same music, creating a frame that encloses the whole work:

2 
The second movement begins the excerpts from Romans 8, setting verse 1, "" (There is therefore now no condemnation to them which are in Christ Jesus). The difference between living in the flesh and the spirit is an aspect that is repeated throughout the motet. The movement is also in E minor, but for five voices.

The beginning of the text is rendered in "rhetorical" homophony: Bach accented the word "nichts" (nothing), repeating it twice, with long rests and echo dynamics. Jones noted that dramatic word painting of this kind was in the tradition of 17th-century motets, such as by Johann Christoph and Johann Michael Bach.

3 
The third movement is a five-part setting of the second stanza of the hymn, "" (Under your protection). While the first soprano provides the chorale melody, the lower voices supply vivid lines expressing the text.

4 
The fourth movement sets the second verse from Romans 8, "" (For the law of the Spirit of life in Christ Jesus hath made me free from the law of sin and death.). The thought is set for the two sopranos and alto, beginning in G major. The sopranos move in "beatific" parallel thirds in the opening when singing of "life in Christ Jesus".

5 

The fifth movement is a setting of the third stanza of the hymn, "" (Despite the old dragon). The defiant opposition, also to death, fear and the rage of the world, is expressed in a free composition. The soprano melody paraphrases the hymn tune by quoting short motifs from the chorale. The movement is in the bar form as the original melody. Five voices take part in a dramatic illustration as they depict defiance by standing firmly and singing, often in powerful unison. Gardiner compared the movement referring to the medieval image of the old dragon, to paintings by Cranach and Grünewald. The rhetoric style is similar to the beginning of the second movement. Gardiner noted that the firm stance against opposition could depict Martin Luther's attitude and also the composer's own stance, and summarises:

6 
The central sixth movement sets verse 9 from Romans 8, "" (But ye are not in the flesh, but in the Spirit). Again beginning in G major, the tenor starts with a fugue theme that stresses the word "geistlich" (of the Spirit) by a long melisma in the fast notes, while the opposite "fleischlich" is a long note stretched over the bar-line. The alto enters during the melisma. All five voices participate in a lively fugue, the only one within the motet. It is a double fugue, with a first theme for the first line, another for the second, "" (since the Spirit of God lives otherwise in you), before both of them are combined in various ways, parallel and in stretti. By contrast, the third line of verse 9, "" (Any one who does not have the spirit of Christ does not belong to him) is set in a homophonic adagio: "not of Christ".

7 
The seventh movement is a four-part setting of the fourth stanza of the hymn, "" (Away with all treasures). While the soprano sings the chorale melody, the lower voices intensify the gesture; "weg" (away) is repeated several times in fast succession. Throughout the movement, the lower voices intensify the expressiveness of the text.

8 
The eighth movement sets verse 10 from Romans 8, "" (And if Christ be in you, the body is dead because of sin). As in the fourth movement, it is set as a trio, this time for alto, tenor and bass, beginning in C major. Parallel thirds in the upper voices resemble those in the fourth movement.

9 
The ninth movement is a setting of the fifth stanza of the hymn, "" (Good night, existence that cherishes the world). For the rejection of everything earthly, Bach composed a chorale fantasia, with the cantus firmus in the alto voice and repetition of "Gute Nacht" in the two sopranos and the tenor. Jones pointed out that the absence of a bass may depict that "the world" lacks a firm foundation in Christ. The chorale melody used in the movement is slightly different from the one in the other settings within the motet, a version which Bach used mostly in his earlier time in Weimar and before. For Gardiner, the "sublime" music suggests the style of Bach's Weimar period. Jones, however, found that the "bewitchingly lyrical setting" matched compositions from the mid-1720s in Leipzig, comparing the music to the Sarabande from the Partita No. 3, BWV 827.

10 
The tenth movement sets verse 11 from Romans 8, "" (But if the Spirit of him that raised up Jesus from the dead dwell in you). In symmetry, the music recalls that of the second movement.

11 
The motet ends with the same four-part setting as the first movement, with the last stanza of the hymn as lyrics, "" (Flee, you mournful spirits). The final line repeats the beginning on the same melody: "" (You stay with me even in sorrow, / Jesus, my joy).

Reception, performances and publication 
 is unique in Bach's work in its complex symmetrical structure, which juxtaposes hymn and Bible text. Bach's vivid setting of the contrasting texts results in music of an unusually dramatic range. Wolff summarised: 

Performers of  have to decide if they will use a boys' choir (as Bach had in mind) or a mixed choir, a small vocal ensemble or a larger choir, and if instruments should accompany the voices, a continuo group or also instruments playing .

18th and 19th centuries 
The motet's SATB chorales were copied in several 18th-century manuscripts collecting chorale harmonisations by Bach. The earliest extant copy of such chorale collections, the Dietel manuscript, also contains a SATB version of the motet's five-part third movement: Dietel's copy omitted the second soprano part of the movement. Carl Philipp Emanuel Bach retained two chorales, based on the motet's first and seventh movements, in the third volume of Breitkopf's 1780s edition of Bach's four-part chorales.

After Bach's death, the motets, unlike much of his other music, were kept continuously in the repertoire of the Thomanerchor.

20th and 21st centuries

In the 1920s, the large Bach Choir in London performed Bach's works conducted by Ralph Vaughan Williams, while Charles Kennedy Scott performed  with his Bach Cantata Club in chamber formation, which prompted a reviewer to write: "It would be absurd to forbid Bach's Motets to big choirs, but this performance left no doubt that the listener gets the truth of the music from voices few and picked." The optimum size of the choir in this work continues to be discussed to this day, for example in reviews of Philippe Herreweghe's one voice per part recordings of 1985 and 2010.  has been recorded more than 60 times, mostly in combination with other motets by Bach. Sets with a recording of BWV 227 alongside other Bach motets include:
 Philippe Herreweghe with the Collegium Vocale Gent and La Chapelle Royale (recorded November 1985, released 1986)
 Harry Christophers with the Sixteen, 1989
 Masaaki Suzuki with the Bach Collegium Japan, using instruments playing , 2009
 Herreweghe, second set recorded in 2010
 Gardiner, whose second recording of the motets with the Monteverdi Choir in 2011 received a Gramophone Award in 2013 in the category Baroque Vocal.

The New Bach Edition (Neue Bach-Ausgabe, NBA) published the motet in 1965, edited by Konrad Ameln, with critical commentary published in 1967. In 1995, Bärenreiter published the vocal parts of the six motets BWV 225–230 from the NBA in one volume, with a preface by Klaus Hofmann. The motets were published by Carus-Verlag in 1975, edited by Günter Graulich, and published again in 2003, edited by Uwe Wolf, as part of the Stuttgarter Bach-Ausgaben, a complete edition of Bach's vocal works. Modern editions of the motet may supply a reconstructed instrumental accompaniment, such as a continuo realisation, and/or a singable translation of the lyrics, as for instance in Carus's 2003 publication of the motet.

Notes and references

Notes

References

Cited sources

Bach Digital

Books

 
 
  Preface in English and German.
 
 
 
 
 
 
 
 
 
 
  Vol. I – Vol. II – Vol. III
 
 
 
 
   Vol. IV

Journals

Online sources

External links 

 
 
 
 
 

Motets by Johann Sebastian Bach
Christian funeral music
Compositions in E minor